Sean Paulhus is an American politician from the state of Maine. He is a member of the Maine House of Representatives, representing District 52. He is a member of the Maine Democratic Party.

Paulhus served as a city councillor for Bath, Maine. He won a special election to the Maine House of Representatives for the 52nd district on April 2, 2019.

References

External links

Living people
Democratic Party members of the Maine House of Representatives
People from Bath, Maine
Maine city council members
Year of birth missing (living people)
21st-century American politicians